Estadio Milton Flores is a multi-use stadium in La Lima, Honduras. It is used mostly for football matches and is the home stadium of Atletico Limeño.

Milton Flores